Elizabeth "Ella" Finkel AM (née Sher) is a multi-award-winning Australian science journalist, author and communicator. A former biochemist, she has been broadcast on ABC Radio National, and written for publications such as Science, The Lancet, Nature Medicine, The Bulletin, New Scientist, The Age and The Monthly. In 2005 Finkel co-founded the popular science magazine COSMOS, served as Editor in Chief from 2013 to 2018 and she remains its Editor at Large. In 2016 she was made a Member of the Order of Australia (AM) for her science communication work and philanthropy. In 2019 Finkel was awarded a Doctor of Laws honoris causa from Monash University and the Medal of the Australian Society for Medical Research. She now serves as a Vice Chancellor's Fellow at La Trobe University and on advisory committees for La Trobe University Press, the ARC Centre of Excellence for Australian Biodiversity and Heritage (CABAH) and the Melbourne Zoo.

Education
Born in 1956 in Warsaw, Poland, Ella migrated to Melbourne in 1957. She attended Princess Hill Primary School in North Carlton, St Kilda Park Primary School, Caulfield Central, and The Mac.Roberston Girls’ High School.  
In 1978 she completed a Bachelor of Science with Honours at Monash University, with a thesis on ‘Regulation of the mitochondrial genome’. Ella then embarked on a PhD in biochemistry at Melbourne University's Department of Medicine titled ‘Studies of the 1,25 dihydroxyvitamin D3 receptor’.
In post-doctoral research she spent one year in Professor John Baxter's laboratory at the University of California San Francisco (UCSF), working on the regulation of the human growth hormone gene. This was followed by four years in Professor Patrick O’Farrell's laboratory at UCSF, investigating the genes that sculpt a fruit fly egg into an embryo – work that was published in Nature.

Career
Upon returning to Melbourne, Finkel turned to freelance journalism in both radio and print media. She has been described by former editor of COSMOS Wilson da Silva as "researching topics to within an inch of their lives", efforts that have been rewarded with numerous awards (see Selected awards below).

Personal life
Ella has been married to neuroscientist, entrepreneur and former Chief Scientist of Australia Alan Finkel since 1982. They have two sons and live in Melbourne. Through the A & E Finkel Foundation the Finkels support diverse projects centred around education, research and quality journalism.

Selected awards

1994 Michael Daley Award for best radio feature broadcast on Ockham’s Razor: ‘Nitric Oxide’

2005: Winner Queensland Premiers literary award for Best Science Writer, for ‘Stem Cells: controversy at the frontiers of science’

2005: Eureka Award for promoting the public understanding of science (finalist) for ‘Stem Cells: controversy at the frontiers of science’

2007: Winner Bell Award for best Analytical Writer

2007: Winner Bell Award for best Feature

2010: Shortlisted Queensland Premier's Literary Award for ‘The Trouble with Genes’ and ‘Black Harvest’ published in Cosmos

2011: National Press Club's Higher Education Journalist of the Year

2015: Eureka Award for Science Journalism for ‘A statin a day’, Cosmos

2016: Order of Australia (AM)

2019: Doctor of Laws honoris causa from Monash University

2019: Medal of the Australian Society for Medical Research

Selected publications

Books
Stem Cells: controversies at the frontiers of science
 
The Genome Generation

The Best Australian Science Writing 2012 (ED)

Articles
2021 ‘Countdown to iBlastoids’, The Monthly

2019 'Chasing the miracle of gene therapy', The Monthly

2018 Lines in the sand: Coming to terms with Patricia Piccinini

Cosmos magazine articles

sciencemag.org articles

‘Two-tiered regulation of spatially patterned engrailed gene expression during Drosophila embryogenesis,’  Nature, 1988

References

External links

Australian freelance journalists
Australian biochemists
Australian women chemists
Academic staff of La Trobe University
Jewish Australian writers
University of California, San Francisco faculty
Monash University alumni
University of Melbourne alumni
Living people
Science journalists
Year of birth missing (living people)
Australian women journalists
Women science writers
Writers from Melbourne